Annick Press is a Canadian book publishing company that was founded in Toronto, Ontario in 1975 by Anne Millyard and Rick Wilks. Rick Wilks became the sole owner in 2000. A second editorial office was opened in Vancouver by Colleen MacMillan in 1999. Annick Press publishes approximately thirty books of fiction and non-fiction for children and young adults per year.

Annick Press is a member of the Association of Canadian Publishers, the Organization of Book Publishers of Ontario, and IBBY Canada. It was recently made a part of the Canadian government's "Read Up On It" programme through Library and Archives Canada.

Notable authors
Priscilla Galloway, children's book author, winner of the Bologna Ragazzi award in 2000
K.V. Johansen, winner of the Ann Connor Brimer Award
Robert Munsch, a member of the Order of Canada and "Canada's best-selling author," who "sells more books than any other Canadian author every year". 
Bill Richardson, winner of the Stephen Leacock Medal for Humour in 1994
Roslyn Schwartz, creator of the Mole Sisters books and television programme
Kathy Stinson, creator of the Bare Naked Book originally published in 1986 and rerelased in 2021 with updated illustrations by Melissa Cho.

Awards
In 2014, The Man With the Violin, written by Kathy Stinson and illustrated by  Dušan Petričić, won the TD Children's Literature Award
In 2009, Mattland, written by Hazel Hutchins and Gail Hebert and illustrated by  Dušan Petričić, won the Amelia Frances Howard-Gibbon Illustrator's Award from the Canadian Library Association
Leslie's Journal by Allan Stratton was named to the American Library Association's "Best Books for Young Adults" booklist

References

External links
 Annick Press official website
 A podcast interview from "Just One More Book" with Rick Wilks of Annick Press, from 2007 (accessed November 18, 2009)

Children's book publishers
Book publishing companies of Canada